Shy People is a 1987 American drama about two branches of a family that reunite, with tragic results. It stars Barbara Hershey, Jill Clayburgh, and Martha Plimpton. It was directed by Andrei Konchalovsky, written by Konchalovsky, Marjorie David and Gérard Brach, and features music by the German electronic music group Tangerine Dream.

Hershey won the Best Actress award at the 1987 Cannes Film Festival for her performance. It was one of the last film roles for actor Merritt Butrick, who died from AIDS in 1989. It was filmed by the bayous of South Louisiana.

Plot summary
Diana Sullivan is a successful Manhattan writer and photojournalist, seemingly oblivious to the serious cocaine addiction that her wild child daughter, Grace, has developed.  A commission by Cosmopolitan magazine to write an article about a lost branch of Diana's family leads them deep into the bayous of Louisiana, where they encounter Diana's distant cousin, Ruth.  Married at 12 to an abusive man whose current whereabouts are an increasingly troubling cipher, Ruth rules over her three adult sons, all less than perfectly cogent, with equal parts protectiveness and ferocity, while a fourth, disowned son adds to the volatility of the situation.  As the fascinated Diana and wary Ruth circle one another, Grace, bored and in grip of her addiction, toys with her naive cousins with devastating consequences.

Cast
Jill Clayburgh as Diana Sullivan 
Barbara Hershey as Ruth 
Martha Plimpton as Grace Sullivan
Merritt Butrick as Mike 
John Philbin as Tommy 
Don Swayze as Mark 
Pruitt Taylor Vince as Paul 
Mare Winningham as Candy

Soundtrack 

Shy People is the thirty-third major release and eleventh soundtrack album by Tangerine Dream. It is the soundtrack to the 1988 movie of the same name.

Track listing

Personnel
 Edgar Froese
 Chris Franke
 Paul Haslinger
 Jacquie Virgil — vocals on "Shy People" and "Dancing On A White Moon"
 Diamond Ross — vocals on "The Harbor"

The movie's actual sound track uses different versions of "Shy People" and "The Harbor" with different sets of lyrics, sung by Michael Bishop.

Cinematography
Shy People was shot by two-time Academy Award-winner Chris Menges, who also worked on A World Apart, a film for which Barbara Hershey was recognized at the 1988 Cannes Film Festival.

Reception

Critical response
Shy People has an approval rating of 64% on review aggregator website Rotten Tomatoes, based on 11 reviews, and an average rating of 6.18/10.

Awards and nominations
Winner: 1987 Cannes Film Festival - Best Actress - Barbara Hershey
Nominee: 1987 Cannes Film Festival - Golden Palm
Nominee: 1988 Independent Spirit Awards - Best Supporting Actress - Martha Plimpton

References

External links 
 
 
New York Times review by Vincent Canby
Chicago Sun-Times review by Roger Ebert
Screen Slate write-up by Cosmo Bjorkenheim

1987 films
1987 drama films
Golan-Globus films
Films directed by Andrei Konchalovsky
Films set in Louisiana
Films shot in Louisiana
Southern Gothic films
Films scored by Tangerine Dream
Films produced by Menahem Golan
Films about writers
Films produced by Yoram Globus
1980s English-language films
1980s American films